Golubinci railway station is a railway station on Belgrade–Šid railway. Located in Golubinci, Stara Pazova, Serbia. Railroad continued to Putinci in one, in the other direction to Stara Pazova and the third direction towards to Inđija.  Golubinci railway station consists of 5 railway track.

See also 
 Serbian Railways

References 

Stara Pazova
Railway stations in Vojvodina